Pahlira Sena Chawngthu (1922–2005) was a Mizo poet, singer, and radio broadcaster from the Indian state of Mizoram.

Career
PS Chawngthu served the Royal Indian Air Force during pre-independence period. Later, he worked as a broadcaster with the Aizawl station of the All India Radio. His poems are included in the curriculum of the Central Board of Secondary Education (CBSE).

Awards
 He was a recipient of 1999 Mizo Academy of Letters Award. 
 The Government of India awarded him the fourth highest civilian award of the Padma Shri in 2000.

Personal
PS Chawngthu was Born in 1922. Chawngthu died on 2005, at the age of 83.

References

External links 

 

Recipients of the Padma Shri in literature & education
1922 births
2005 deaths
20th-century Indian poets
Mizo people
Indian broadcasters
Indian male musicians
Indian male singer-songwriters
Indian singer-songwriters
Singers from Mizoram
All India Radio people
20th-century Indian singers
Writers from Mizoram
20th-century Indian male writers
20th-century Indian male singers